Qix Adventure is a 1999 video game developed by Coconuts Japan Entertainment and published by Taito for the Game Boy Color. An English port of the game was developed by Evolution Entertainment for the United Kingdom in 2000. The game is a puzzle game based on the 1981 Taito title Qix, with additional story elements.

Gameplay 

Similar to Qix, Qix Adventure is a puzzle game in which players draw a line to enclose areas of the screen, with the goal of enclosing 75% of the screen as the space fills up with boxes, whilst avoiding moving enemies, Qix and Sparx, that hinder the player's progress. The game features three modes of play. In 'Treasure' mode, the game requires the player to capture enemies by boxing them in and claiming the treasures they leave behind, providing additional opponents, bonus items and score multipliers. In this mode, players can also view collected treasure and use them to decorate a room. 'Original' mode follows the traditional rules of Qix. 'Battle' mode allows two players with one Game Pak or a Game Link Cable to compete against each other.

Development 

Qix Adventure was showcased by Natsume at E3 in 2000 and 2001. The game experienced development and manufacturing issues that delayed release of the title in some locations to 2001.

Reception 

Qix Adventure received lukewarm reviews. Pocket Gamer stated the game was "addictive as ever", and "solid fun and easy to learn and play", praising "the adventure mode (as) a great addition". Game Boy Official Magazine stated that the game "doesn't look the most exciting", but were "pleasantly surprised by how addictive (the game) is".

References

External links 
 

Qix
1999 video games
Game Boy Color games
Game Boy Color-only games
Multiplayer and single-player video games
Puzzle video games
Taito games